Pota is a village panchayat located in the Mahendragarh district in the Indian state of Haryana.

History 
Pota is a village in Kanina tehsil in Mahendragarh district of Haryana state, India. It belongs to Gurgaon Division . It is located 45 km towards North from District headquarters Narnaul. 20 km from district Mahendergarh. 18 km from Kanina. 327 km from State capital Chandigarh .

The word Pota means "grandson" in Hindi. There are many stories as to how this name was coined, but the most famous story is that once a man along with his family members were passing by this area. They planned to stop here and take rest. The man's daughter in law who was pregnant gave birth to a boy. Being extremely elated the man decided to make this forest area a residential area and name it Pota, After that this is known by this name.

Demographics 
The total population of the village is around 5,500. There are many castes in this village; notable among them are  Yadavs (Ahir) and Rajputs (Thakur). The native language of Pota is Haryanvi, but most of the village people can speak and understand Hindi and English.

Location 
The nearest town is Kanina at a distance of about 18 km. It is located around 20 km away from district Mahendergarh. It is located around 327 km away from Chandigarh which is the state capital. The other major cities are Delhi and a distance of 106 km and Jaipur at about 221 km away. The surrounding nearby villages and its distance from Pota are Sehlang, Bagoth, Chriya, Sayana, and Nautana.

Transport 
It is connected by roads to all parts of the country. The nearest railway station is Gudha and Kanina at a distance of about 12 km and 18 km. The nearest airport is Indira Gandhi International Airport, Delhi situated at a distance of about 105 km.

Highway 
Near Highway NH-152D

Education

Schools 
 Govt.Sr Sec school
 RHM High School
 Hindu High School

Nearest College/ University 
 Central University of Haryana
 Dav College Of Engineering And Technology (davcet), Kanina
 PKSD PG College Kanina
Government PG College Mahendergarh
Suraj PG College Mahendergarh
RPS College Mahendergarh
Yaduvanshi Degree College Mahendergarh
Janta College Charkhi dadri
BR Degree College Sehlang

Temple 

 Baba kushaldas's temple
 Baba brahampuri Maharaj temple
 Baba Nur-Kha temple
And many temples are like lord ram, mata mandir and Sarva Dharam mandir

References 

Villages in Mahendragarh district